Bishop John J. Ahern DCL, STL,  was an Irish Roman Catholic Bishop, who served as Bishop of Cloyne from 1957 until 1987.

Born in 1911, a native of Leamlara, near Midleton, Co Cork, Dr Ahern was ordained in 1936. Dr Ahern was appointed professor of canon law at Maynooth College in 1946 until 1956, when he was appointed to the see of Cloyne. He was a council father at the second vatican council.
He retired as Bishop in 1987 and died on 25 September 1997. Bishop John Magee succeeded him at Cloyne.
The National School in Leamlara, which succeeded the one he attended, is named in his honour.

References

1911 births
1997 deaths
20th-century Roman Catholic bishops in Ireland
Alumni of St Patrick's College, Maynooth